The headquarters of the Banco de Londres y América del Sur or Bank of London and South America in Buenos Aires was designed by Argentine architects Clorindo Testa and SEPRA (Santiago Sánchez Elía, Federico Peralta Ramos, Alfredo Agostini). It is located in San Nicolás.

In 1959, a design contest was announced the project by the Bank of London and South America. The land was located on a street corner in the Buenos Aires CBD, an area housing nearly half the nation's financial activity. The winning design was submitted by Clorindo Testa and SEPRA.

The project's architectural approach was among the most far-reaching and well-known local contributions to international architecture of the 1960s, as well as the country's most easily  identifiable example of Brutalist architecture.

The building, completed in 1966, was occupied by the local Lloyds Bank branch during the 1980s and early 1990s, and in 1997, was acquired by the newly privatized Banco Hipotecario.

External links
 Pictures

Buildings and structures in Buenos Aires
Buildings and structures completed in 1966
Brutalist architecture in Argentina
Bank headquarters